South Africa participated in the ninth Winter Paralympics in Turin, Italy. The team consisted of a single athlete, alpine skier Bruce Warner. Warner did not win any medals.

See also
2006 Winter Paralympics
South Africa at the 2006 Winter Olympics

External links
Torino 2006 Paralympic Games
International Paralympic Committee
National Paralympic Committee of South Africa

Nations at the 2006 Winter Paralympics
Winter Paralympics
2006